Patrick Wayne Kearney (born September 24, 1939), also known as The Trash Bag Killer, is an American serial killer and necrophile who murdered a minimum of 21 boys and young men from 1962 to 1977 in southern California. He is one of three men referred to as The Freeway Killer, William Bonin and Randy Kraft being the other two; all three killed similar victims in the same general timespan. Kearney may be among the most prolific serial killers in U.S. history, claiming possibly as many as 43 victims according to law enforcement.

Early life
Patrick Wayne Kearney was born on September 24, 1939, as the oldest of three sons and was raised in a reasonably stable family of middle-class background. As a thin and sickly child, he was often a target for bullies at school, who beat him up frequently and berated him as a "queer" despite his supposed interest in girls. In his teens, he became withdrawn and harbored fantasies about killing personal enemies, often ending in Kearney skinning them alive. In addition, he developed sexual fantasies revolving around domination and began engaging in bestiality
when he was 13.

Born in East Los Angeles, California, Kearney also lived in Texas. He returned to California following a brief marriage that ended in divorce and eventually worked as an engineer for Hughes Aircraft.

It was from his experiences in his early years in California that Kearney cultivated his skill as a gay pickup artist. Kearney mostly sought out partners in San Diego and Tijuana, Mexico, where he used his fluency in Spanish and keen interest in Latin American culture as a basis to connect with potential partners. Kearney claimed to have killed his first victim, a hitchhiker he picked up and murdered in Orange, California, around 1962. He claimed several more victims, mostly transients, before moving to Redondo Beach, near Los Angeles, in 1967 with a man named David Hill, who became his lover.

Murders
As time passed Hill and Kearney began to argue more often, and Kearney would go out for long solitary drives in his Volkswagen Beetle or his truck. He would then pick up and kill young male hitchhikers or young men from gay bars. Kearney was a necrophile and was generally consistent in the manner in which he murdered his victims and disposed of their remains.

Being of slight build, Kearney was forced to resort to a system of subduing his victims that was unlikely to fail or create situations which could place him in physical danger or cause unwanted exposure to authorities. He was not sadistic and did not inflict pain on his victims as the other two "Freeway Killers" did, preferring quickness and efficiency. While Kearney did later confess to having mutilated his victims' bodies out of curiosity, such as cutting open one of their stomachs, he did so post-mortem and did not inflict any physical suffering.

Kearney confessed to having committed his first murder in the spring of 1962. The victim's name is unknown, but he was confirmed to be age nineteen and white. Kearney had convinced the male to take a ride on his motorcycle with him to a secluded area outside of Indio, California. When they arrived, Kearney shot the man in the head and sexually assaulted the body. It is unknown if the body was ever found, but Kearney did indeed confess to committing this murder and two additional ones during 1962. The second victim was the younger cousin of Kearney's first victim, who had witnessed Kearney drive away with the victim.

The first murder that Kearney confessed to and was convicted of, occurred "sometime around Christmas" of 1968, while he was living in Culver City, approximately one year after he and David Hill had taken residence together. The murder took place inside his Van Buren Avenue residence. According to Kearney, this victim (whose name is known as "George") was lured into his vehicle in San Diego and taken to his home, then shot in the head moments after entering the house. The victim was then dragged to his bathroom, where he was sodomized, then skinned and dismembered in the bathtub with an X-Acto knife. Kearney also extracted the bullet from the victim's head to ensure the murder would not be traced to him. He then buried the dismembered body behind his garage. Kearney did not kill for over a year following this murder, primarily out of fear that law enforcement would inquire about the disappearance of George. Years later, the identity of this victim has yet to have been discovered besides his first name.

As time passed, Kearney greatly refined his modus operandi, which enabled him to carry out his crimes much more efficiently and frequently. Starting in 1974, Kearney is estimated to have committed murders on an almost monthly basis. After picking up his victims along the freeway or at gay bars in his Volkswagen or in his truck, Kearney would typically shoot his victims in the temple above the ear with a Derringer .22 pistol in his right hand, while steering his car with his left hand and simultaneously monitoring the car's speed to avoid exhibiting any unusual behavior to potential witnesses. After murdering his victims, Kearney would leave the bodies slumped upright in the passenger seat and drive to a secluded area to sexually violate them.

After copulating with his victims' corpses, Kearney would usually mutilate and dismember the remains with a hacksaw before disposing of them in various locations such as canyons, landfills, and along the freeways, usually in industrial trash bags. In some cases, Kearney disposed of the bodies in the desert, where they could be consumed by carrion-eating animals. Kearney would sometimes drain the victim's blood to eliminate odor and would also sometimes bathe the body parts prior to disposal to minimize the presence of dried blood and eliminate fingerprint evidence. Sometimes, Kearney would beat his victims after they were dead.; he perceived beating his dead victims as a cathartic exercise and a means by which he could effectively vent suppressed anger and acquire a sense of power. Often, the victims resembled people who had bullied him in his childhood.

Although Kearney primarily preyed on young men, there were known child and adolescent victims as well. Kearney's youngest victim was Ronald Dean Smith, age 5, who disappeared in Lennox, California on August 24, 1974. His body was discovered in Riverside County on October 12, 1974. Merle "Hondo" Chance, 8, of Venice, vanished on April 6, 1977, while supposedly riding his bicycle in the vicinity of Kearney's place of work. Kearney claims to have smothered the boy, taken his body home overnight and later disposed of the remains in the Angeles National Forest off Angeles Crest Highway, approximately 11 miles north of Altadena. Chance's decomposed remains were discovered on May 26, 1977. Merle Chance was Kearney's last known victim.

On June 16, 1976, Kearney killed Michael Craig McGhee, 13, of Redondo Beach. Records confirmed that McGhee had a lengthy history of juvenile delinquency. Kearney claimed to have picked up McGhee, who was hitchhiking from Inglewood Avenue near Lennox to Torrance. According to the police, Kearney had befriended the boy and invited him to attend a camping trip to Lake Elsinore over the course of a weekend. Kearney claimed to have perceived McGhee as a potential threat and shot him without warning after McGhee openly boasted of his criminal exploits and inquired about the presence and location of burglar alarms in Kearney's home. Later, when interviewed by detectives, Kearney implied that he had destroyed the remains, stating: "I disposed of the body... You aren't going to find him."

The victim who ultimately led to Kearney's arrest was John Otis LaMay, 17, whom he killed on Sunday, March 13, 1977. At approximately 5:30 pm on that same day, LaMay had told a neighbor he was going to Redondo Beach to meet a man named Dave, whom he had met at a local gym. This was in fact David Hill, who had given LaMay the address to Kearney's home. Hill was absent when LaMay arrived, so Kearney invited him in to watch television until Hill returned. Without provocation, Kearney impulsively reached for his pistol and shot LaMay in the back of the head. Kearney later dismembered the corpse and dumped the remains in the desert.

When his killing spree was at its zenith, Kearney's odd tendencies went largely undetected. A local grocery store owner named Jerry Stevens did, however, note that Kearney frequently purchased butcher knives after examining them and inquiring about the quality of the steel. Stevens also described Kearney as "a loner with an eerie sense of quiet about him." Kearney's supervisor at Hughes Aircraft referred to him as a "model worker."

Victims

Capture and imprisonment
LaMay's remains were found on March 18, 1977. Police had actually been to Kearney's home for the LaMay investigation prior to Chance's kidnapping and murder. The police soon discovered that LaMay had been seen in the company of Kearney and Hill. The two fled to El Paso, Texas, and Kearney resigned from his job. The fugitives' families persuaded the pair to turn themselves in. Hill, 36 years old at the time, was eventually cleared of any involvement in Kearney's crimes and was released.

Kearney made a full confession, initially admitting to a total of twenty-eight murders and subsequently to seven more. In order to avoid a death sentence, he agreed to plead guilty. Kearney was charged with twenty-one counts of murder, and as agreed, pleaded guilty. He was given twenty-one life sentences. Police are certain that Kearney was responsible for the other seven murders he had admitted to, but lacked the physical evidence to charge him. , Kearney is incarcerated at California's Mule Creek State Prison.

See also
List of serial killers in the United States
List of serial killers by number of victims

References

Further reading
The Trash Bag Murderer (2010) by Tony Stewart

External links 
Patrick Kearney at the Crime Library
Patrick Kearney “The Trash Bag Killer” Radford University

1939 births
1965 murders in the United States
20th-century American criminals
20th-century American LGBT people
American male criminals
American murderers of children
American people convicted of murder
American prisoners sentenced to life imprisonment
American rapists
American serial killers
Criminals from Los Angeles
American gay men
LGBT people from California
Living people
Male serial killers
Necrophiles
People convicted of murder by California
People from East Los Angeles, California
People from Redondo Beach, California
People from Texas
Prisoners sentenced to life imprisonment by California
Violence against men in North America
Zoophilia